Bagiya (also called  Pithha) is a delicacy of the Maithil, Tharu and Dhimal communities of India and Nepal. It is a steamed dumpling that consists of an external covering of rice flour and an inner content of sweet substances such like chaku, vegetables and other fried items. The delicacy plays a very important role in Tharu society, and is a key part of the festival of Diwali (also known as Deepawali or Tihar) on the day of Laxmi Puja.

See also 
Indian Cuisine
Dhikri
Yomari
List of Nepalese dishes

References

External links 
 How to make Bagiya?

Indian cuisine
Mithila
Nepalese desserts
Tharu cuisine